Nauruans are a nation and an ethnic group indigenous to the Pacific island country of Nauru. They are most likely a blend of Micronesian, Melanesian and Polynesian ancestry.

The origin of the Nauruan people has not yet been finally determined. It was probably seafaring or shipwrecked Polynesians or Melanesians, who established themselves there because there was not already an indigenous population present, whereas the Micronesians were already crossed with the Melanesians in this area.

The Nauruans have two elements of their population: the native Micronesians and the Polynesians who had immigrated long before. Through these two extremes, diverse traditions came to exist.

In about 1920, influenza spread through Nauru, which took a heavy toll on the Nauruans. In 1925, the first cases of diabetes were diagnosed by doctors. Today, depending on age, every second to third Nauruan is diabetic – a higher rate than any other country in the world.

Tribes
The nauruans were historically divided into 12 tribes, and when a child is born he or she will inherit their tribe from their mother's side. Clothes for each tribe were all different which helped to identify each individual.

Here are the names of the 12 tribes and each of their  historically associated concepts:

 Eamwit - snake/eel, sly, slippery, good at lying and copier of styles.
 Eamwitmwit - cricket/insect, vain beautiful, tidiness, with a shrill noise and manner alike.
 Eaoru - destroyer, harms plans, jealous type.
 Eamwidara - dragonfly.
 Iruwa- stranger, foreigner, a person from other countries, intelligent, beautiful, masculine.
 Eano-straightforward, mad, eager.
 Iwi - lice (extinct).
 Irutsi - cannibalism (extinct).
 Deiboe - small black fish, moody, cheater, behavior can change any time.
 Ranibok - object washed ashore.
 Emea - user of rake, slave, healthy, beautiful hair, cheat in friendship.
 Emangum - player, actor

Society
Nauruans were classified into three social classes: temonibes (senior members of senior clans), amenengames (middle class) and the itsios (serf class). While temonibes and amenengames were determined at birth, itsio were usually allocated by being prisoners of war, and were often treated as goods. There was a separate class of castaways that were treated as pets, but they were never as low as the itsios.

See also 
 Nauruan language
 Nauruan nationality law, for the distinction between indigenous Nauruans and Nauruan citizens

References 

Ethnic groups in Nauru
Indigenous peoples of Micronesia